Alois Graf von Waldburg-Zeil (born 20 September 1933 in Leutkirch im Allgäu; died 14 December 2014) was a German politician.

Life 
His parents were Erich August Fürst von Waldburg zu Zeil und Trauchburg (1899–1953) and Monika Prinzessin zu Löwenstein-Wertheim-Rosenberg (1905–1992). He went to school at Kolleg St. Blasien. He studied politics and economics at universities in Bonn, Rom and Munich.

On June 21, 1956, he married Clarissa Gräfin von Schönborn-Wiesentheid (born in Jüterbog on 14 October 1936).

His children were:
 Monika Gräfin Wolff Metternich zur Gracht (born 1957)
 Clemens Graf von Waldburg-Zeil (born 1960)
 Georg Graf von Waldburg-Zeil (1961–1989)
 Theresa Lenhart Gräfin von Waldburg-Zeil (born 1962)
 Franz-Anton Graf von Waldburg-Zeil (1964–1987)

Waldburg-Zeil was from 1980 to 1998 member of German Bundestag.

Awards 

 Order of Merit of the Federal Republic of Germany
 National Order of the Lion from Senegal
 1993: Order of Merit of Baden-Württemberg
 Order of St. Gregory the Great
 Order of Isabella the Catholic

References

External links 

 Bundestag: Alois Graf von Waldburg-Zeil
 Spiegel.de: Schwabens milliardenschwere Blaublüter, May 1, 2001

1933 births
2014 deaths
People from Leutkirch im Allgäu
Christian Democratic Union of Germany politicians
Members of the Bundestag for Baden-Württemberg
Members of the Bundestag 1994–1998
Members of the Bundestag 1990–1994
Members of the Bundestag 1987–1990
Members of the Bundestag 1983–1987
Members of the Bundestag 1980–1983
Members of the Bundestag for the Christian Democratic Union of Germany
German landowners
Officers Crosses of the Order of Merit of the Federal Republic of Germany
Knights Commander of the Order of St Gregory the Great
Recipients of the Order of Merit of Baden-Württemberg
Recipients of the Order of Isabella the Catholic
Recipients of orders, decorations, and medals of Senegal